A Black Veil for Lisa (lit. "Death has no sex") is a 1968 thriller film directed by Massimo Dallamano.

Plot  
Lisa Buloff wears a black dress and veil at a funeral for an unspecified deceased loved one.

Weeks beforehand, Willie Zoll is drinking at a bar, ready to provide Inspector Franz Buloff, leading investigator in the Hamburg narcotics department for Interpol, information on major drug world target Harry Scheurermann. When he turns a corner into an alley, a figured stabs him to death, leaving the switchblade used and his dime-store disguise behind at the scene. Buloff is extremely disgruntled, as he was going to provide their best lead. Two other contract killings silenced witnesses and whistleblowers beforehand, somehow around the time they were to give information to the police. His boss, Ostermeyer, is most provoked and insists Buloff find another lead.

Buloff returns home to his wife Lisa. She had previous affiliations with Scheurermann, but Buloff believed she wasn't involved in his enterprises and married her. However, Buloff has been controlling and domineering of her, tracking her activities out of paranoia. He demands to know why she didn't answer the phone, and when he doesn't believe her answer that she was sleeping, she bitterly retorts she was waiting for him to suspect something. When he storms off to pour himself a drink, Buloff later sees Lisa changed into a nightdress, and they make love.

Buloff tries to call his wife the next day to check on her again, but she leaves the phone ringing when she heads out the door. He then interrogates a young woman, Marianne Loma, who he briefly hallucinates as Lisa. Under threat of false detainment, the woman reveals her friend Ursula Stein had her pick up a score for Ursula's boyfriend, Kurt Mueller, who can't leave since the drug ring is after him. Marianne is provided protective custody for her cooperation. Lisa then arrives at the station wanting money from Buloff, which he obliges; he tries to ask about her activities later, but she politely refuses the question and says he's too jealous and works too much. The police try to get to Mueller at Ursula's place, but Scheurermann's thugs are there first, beating Ursula even though she doesn't talk, then kidnapping her. Buloff goes to his informant at the news stand, nicknamed "The Rabbit", and all he can provide is tulips are involved in the ring. When asked about Mueller, he avoids giving information out of fear.

The hitman, Max Lindt, meets his employer Olaf, a middle man to Scheurermann. Lindt, while tossing his lucky dollar with a bullet hole he keeps everywhere he goes, takes his pay and plans to by a plane ticket out of the country. Olaf demands he take one more hired murder, leaving Lindt in a tight spot despite Lindt wanting to flee while he's still at large, but Lindt only agrees when Olaf threatens Scheurermann's goons will kill him. Kurt Mueller is his assigned target. When Buloff returns home, he sees a note Lisa left him under a bouquet of tulips. She says she's out having a supper with a school friend, but Buloff finds she left the restaurant early when he heads there. Mueller calls for his fix from Fritz, a bar owner involved with the mob, but Mueller is lured to a post office box by Fritz, with the goons in earshot to report to Lindt. Mueller gets to the letter box, where Lindt is waiting and stabs him to death, leaving his flashlight and disguise behind and breaking Mueller's watch when set to the wrong time.

Buloff interrogates Lisa on her whereabouts, which makes her angry as she's not believed and Buloff doesn't stop wanting to possess her and keep her movements in his orbit. When Buloff criticizes her for her involvement with the drug ring, ironically because of one of the victims Lindt killed, Rhinehardt, Lisa merely counters with how her home life isn't better. When she proclaims in spite she'll find an affair to have with another man, Buloff hits her and she runs off. Mueller is found by the police, and the package, in a letter box under "Wiener", was really filled with baking soda, but Buloff catches a break as he finds Lindt accidentally left his lucky dollar behind. Lindt flips out when he realizes he's lost it and tears apart wherever he worries it might be. Buloff finally fingers Lindt when he sees him in lobby footage at headquarters, remembering his habit of tossing it.

Buloff has his men check up on a red Porsche he knows Lisa was in. He finds Lindt's friend, Eric Scheurer, at his job at the fun fair, accosting him for info he doesn't give. When Scheurer calls Lindt's hotel from a payphone, Buloff watches and intercepts the call to get Lindt's location. Buloff gets Lindt's room from the hotel staff, arresting him while he packs. When Lindt is given the dollar back, he tries to drop it on the floor for an escape, but Buloff hits him to put it out of his mind. Lindt surrenders and is amazed Buloff is the detective on his case since he's in Narcotics. On the drive to headquarters, Buloff sees Lisa get into a red Porsche, trying to follow her, but losing her. Uncuffing Lindt, Buloff blackmails him into a plan for Lindt to kill Lisa, in exchange for his freedom.

Lisa's friend she mentioned, Irini von Klaus, does have such a car, so when Buloff finds out, he tries to stop Lindt. He finds Lisa at home, still alive, and Buloff apologizes to her. She scolds him for harassing her over how she lives her life and not believing her, and he tries to show he loves her by vehemently kissing her. Buloff gets a call from The Rabbit, who has more info on the tulips, but he's later killed by a car slamming into him, revealing the enforcers got him first. Buloff has Lisa stay at home for the day, as Lindt still believes the job is on and she can't be seen by him. Lindt instead shows up at the house, pretending to be an insurance salesman. Lisa doesn't by it, but they're both attracted to each other and have sex, shortly after Lisa lies to Buloff over the phone no one's at the house.

Buloff is again relieved Lisa is still alive when he returns home, until he reconvenes with max at an abandoned factory. Lindt shamelessly reveals their tryst, before Buloff throws him into his own car hood and says the job is still on. Lindt is torn, but in the end, he doesn't care for killing Lisa and progresses into a full affair with her, where he tells her his real name but not his activities. Buloff tracks them both to the hotel they meet at, then Lisa to a tulip stand. She calls Scheurermann from a payphone, revealing she's the leak who's been ratting the victims out to his ring. As Lisa is also a lover of Scheurermann and gets fixes from him, his henchmen corner Lindt on Olaf's boat and beat him into not seeing her any longer. Lindt calls Buloff for a meeting in the woods to get this lucky dollar back.

Buloff concedes to the consequences of his actions and Lisa's, writing a full report on what he knows about Scheurermann and Lindt, along with his actions, but leaving Lisa out of the details to protect her. Lindt is prepared to meet Buloff, leaving Lisa behind and taking a switchblade with him. When at the rendezvous, Buloff places Lindt under formal arrest, seeing through Lindt's lie about him killing Lisa. Lindt boasts Buloff will pay to, which he accepts. Lindt pulls his knife and slits Buloff's throat before stabbing him, Buloff's last words being "you're done for anyway". While Lisa's at the hotel phoning Scheurermann for another meeting, the police are dispatched to arrest Max. Max runs into the woods and fires Buloff's service weapon, but he's shot dead in retaliation. Lisa meets Scheurermann, who rejects her and reveals he knows about Lindt's affair with her; he shocks her from revealing Buloff hired Lindt to off her. The episode ends with Lisa at the funeral, revealed to be for her late husband. Ostermeyer says to Lisa that Buloff "was an outstanding man [...] to the end"; it's never revealed if he's confirmed her involvement, but he heavily implies wanting her silence about Buloff's corruption.

Cast

Production
A Black Veil for Lisa was shot in 1968 in Hamburg under the title Vicolo cieco. Curti described the style of the film as "remarkably different" from the Italian thrillers of the period, and closer to Anglo-Saxon and German models of the style.

Release
A Black Veil for Lisa was released in Italy in September 1968. was shown in Germany as Das Geheimnis der jungen Witwe (translation: Mystery of the Young Widow). in this country, it was promoted as being part of the Edgar Wallace series.

It was also released as Showdown.

Reception
From contemporary reviews, "Whit." of Variety described the film as an "okay programmer" and that "Massimo Dallamano's direction [...] is as sturdy as script, on which he also collabed, will permit, and color camera work by Angelo Lotti is particularly effective."

References

Sources

External links

 

1968 films
Giallo films
1960s Italian-language films
Films directed by Massimo Dallamano
Films set in West Germany
Films scored by Gianfranco Reverberi
Films scored by Giovanni Fusco
1960s Italian films